Since 1989, Australian singer Kylie Minogue has embarked on fifteen concert tours, including performances in Australia, Europe, Asia, Africa, South America and North America. Minogue's first live concert performance was in 1988 at Canton, a nightclub in Hong Kong. The following year she embarked on her first tour, performing in front of 38,000 at the Tokyo Dome in Japan.

Minogue's stage shows include elaborate costumes and sets that were inspired by Broadway musicals, science fiction films and electronic music groups such as Kraftwerk. In 2003, Minogue was named "Live Performer of the Year" at the Australian Mo Awards.

Concert tours

Other concerts
{|class="wikitable sortable" style="text-align:center;" width=100%
!scope="col" class="unsortable"| Title
!scope="col" width=14%| Date
!scope="col" | Associated album(s)
!scope="col" | Continent(s)
!scope="col" | Shows
!scope="col" | Gross
!scope="col" | Attendance
|-

!scope="row"| Money Can't Buy
| 
| Body Language
|  Europe
| 1
| 
| 
|- class="expand-child"
| colspan="7" style="border-bottom-width:3px; padding:5px;" |
{{hidden
| headercss = font-size: 100%; width: 95%;
| contentcss = text-align: left; font-size: 100%; width: 95%;
| header = Money Can't Buy setlist
| content =

Act 1: Paris By Night
 "Still Standing"
 "Red Blooded Woman"
 "On a Night Like This" (Contains elements of "Singin' in the Rain")

Act 2: Bardello
 "Breathe" / "Je T'aime"
 "After Dark"
 "Chocolate"

Act 3: Electro
 "Can't Get You Out of My Head"
 "Slow"
 "Obsession"
 "In Your Eyes"

Act 4: On Yer Bike
 "Secret (Take You Home)"
 "Spinning Around"

Encore
 "Love at First Sight"

}}
|-

!scope="row"| Summer 2015
|  – 18 July 2015
| 
|  Europe
| 6
| 
| 
|- class="expand-child"
| colspan="7" style="border-bottom-width:3px; padding:5px;" |
{{hidden
| headercss = font-size: 100%; width: 95%;
| contentcss = text-align: left; font-size: 100%; width: 95%;
| header = Summer 2015 setlist
| content =

Act One
"Breathe" 
"Better the Devil You Know"
"In My Arms"
"In Your Eyes"
"Wow"

Act Two
"Bauhaus Disco" 
"Step Back in Time"
"Spinning Around"
"Your Disco Needs You"
"On a Night Like This"
"Bette Davis Eyes"
"Can't Get You Out of My Head"
"Slow"
"I Should Be So Lucky" 
"The Locomotion"
"Kids"

Act Three
"Get Outta My Way"
"Love at First Sight"
"Celebration"
"All the Lovers"

Encore
 "Into the Blue"

}}
|-

!scope="row"| A Kylie Christmas
|  – 10 December 2016
| Kylie ChristmasKylie Christmas: Snow Queen Edition
|  Europe
| 3
| 
| 
|- class="expand-child"
| colspan="7" style="border-bottom-width:3px; padding:5px;" |
{{hidden
| headercss = font-size: 100%; width: 95%;
| contentcss = text-align: left; font-size: 100%; width: 95%;
| header = A Kylie Christmas setlist
| content =

Act One
 "Overture" 
 "It's the Most Wonderful Time of the Year"
 "I'm Gonna Be Warm This Winter"
 "Santa Claus Is Coming to Town"
 "Oh Santa"
 "Christmas Wrapping"
 "Wow"
 "Winter Wonderland"
 "Every Day's Like Christmas"

Act Two
 "Can't Get You Out of My Head"
 "2000 Miles" 
 "Christmas Isn't Christmas 'Til You Get Here"

Act Three
  "On a Night Like This"
 "100 Degrees" 
 "Spinning Around"
 "Your Disco Needs You"

Act Four
  "Santa Baby"
 "Let It Snow"
 "Jingle Bell Rock" 
 "The Twelve Days of Christmas" 
 "The Loco-Motion" 

Act Five
  "White Diamond Theme" 
 "I Believe in You" 
 "Only You"
 "Love at First Sight"
 "All the Lovers"
 "Celebration"

Encore
  "Especially for You"
 "I Wish It Could Be Christmas Everyday"

}}
|-

!scope="row"| Kylie Presents Golden
|  – 25 June 2018
| Golden
|  EuropeNorth America
| 6
| 
| 
|- class="expand-child"
| colspan="7" style="border-bottom-width:3px; padding:5px;" |

|-
!scope="row"| Summer 2019
| – 
| Step Back in Time: The Definitive Collection
| Europe
| 15
|
|
|- class="expand-child"
| colspan="7" style="border-bottom-width:3px; padding:5px;" |
{{hidden
| headercss = font-size: 100%; width: 95%;
| contentcss = text-align: left; font-size: 100%; width: 95%;
| header = Summer 2019 setlist
| content =

Act 1: Ka Pow
 "Love at First Sight"
 "I Should Be So Lucky"
 "On a Night Like This"
 "Get Outta My Way"
 "What Do I Have to Do"
 "Never Too Late"

Act 2: Berlin Electro Love
"Je Ne Sais Pas Pourquoi
 "Hand on Your Heart"
 "In Your Eyes"
 "The One"

Act 3: The Summer in Avalon
"Slow" 
 "Confide in Me"
 "Kids"
 "Can't Get You Out of My Head"

Act 4: The Wedding Disco
"Especially for You"
 "Shocked"
 "Step Back in Time"
 "Better the Devil You Know"
 "The Loco-Motion" 
 "All the Lovers"

Encore: The Final Stretch
"Dancing"
 "Spinning Around"

}}
|-
!scope="row"| Infinite Disco
|7 November 2020 – 31 December 2020
| Disco
| Worldwide
| 2
|
|
|- class="expand-child"
| colspan="7" style="border-bottom-width:3px; padding:5px;" |

|-
|}

Notes

References

General

 Kylie: La La La, William Baker and Kylie Minogue, Hodder and Stoughton, 2002. . Paperback version.

Citations

Sources

External links
 

 
Minogue, Kylie